Kallakurichi division is a revenue division in the Kallakurichi district of Tamil Nadu, India.

References 
 

Kallakurichi district